Shanghai–Wuhan–Chengdu passenger-dedicated railway, is a fully completed higher-speed railway corridor in China. It is operated by CR Shanghai Group, CR Wuhan Group and CR Chengdu Group. The Chinese name of the railway line, Huhanrong, is a combination of the abbreviations for Shanghai, Wuhan, and Chengdu, three major cities along the line.

The Shanghai–Wuhan–Chengdu railway is one of the four east–west high-speed rail corridors outlined in China's national high-speed rail plan. From east to west, it will connect the major cities of Shanghai (a provincial-level municipality), Nanjing (the capital of Jiangsu), Hefei (the capital of Anhui), Wuhan (the capital of Hubei), Chongqing (a province-level municipality), and Chengdu  (the capital of Sichuan). The total population of the four provinces and two municipalities served by this rail line is over 320 million (as of 2008).

Components
All sections are now operational.

Operational lines are marked with green background.

Shanghai–Nanjing

Nanjing to Hefei

From Nanjing to Hefei, the line is called the Hefei–Nanjing railway. The Hefei–Nanjing Railway is shared with the Nanjing–Xi'an railway. At Hefei, a connection is available to the Hefei–Bengbu high-speed railway, which is a branch line of the Beijing–Shanghai high-speed railway, although both Shanghai-Chengdu Main Line and Hefei-Bengbu branch has now mostly used Hefei South Railway Station instead.

Hefei to Wuhan

At Wuhan, a connection is available to the Beijing–Guangzhou–Shenzhen–Hong Kong high-speed railway, an important north-south railway line from Beijing to Guangzhou and Kowloon, Hong Kong, although Hankou Railway Station instead of Wuhan Station is on the main line.

Wuhan to Yichang

From Wuhan to Yichang, the line is called the Wuhan–Yichang railway.

Yichang to Chongqing

Yichang–Wanzhou railway

The Yichang–Wanzhou railway connects the cities of Yichang, Lichuan, and Wanzhou. The Shanghai–Wuhan–Chengdu passenger-dedicated line only uses the Yichang to Lichuan portion of the Yichang–Wanzhou Railway. (The actual splitting point of Yichang-Wanzhou and Chongqing-Lichuan railways is Liangwu railway station)

Chongqing–Lichuan railway

At Lichuan, the Chongqing–Lichuan railway connects it with the city of Chongqing.

Chongqing to Chengdu

Suining–Chongqing railway
The Suining–Chongqing railway connects the cities of Chongqing and Suining.

Suining–Chengdu railway
The Suining–Chengdu railway connects the cities of Suining and Chengdu. Until 2009, this line was considered to form part of the Dazhou–Chengdu railway.

Chengdu–Chongqing intercity railway
The newly constructed Chengdu–Chongqing intercity railway links Chengdu and Chongqing directly using a southern route (via Neijiang).

Routing
While some sections of the line parallels existing conventional railways, others have been constructed on a new separate alignment, done to avoid difficult terrain, provide a more direct route or to serve areas where no rail service existed before. In particular, until the completion of the Shanghai–Nanjing intercity railway, passenger trains between Shanghai and Nanjing ran on the "conventional", but greatly upgraded, Jinghu railway; conventional railways likewise have long existed along fairly direct routes between Nanjing and Hefei, or between Chongqing and Chengdu.

On the other hand, the Hefei-Wuhan railway, which involved a significant amount of tunneling when passing through the Dabie Mountains, allowed to significantly shorten the railway distance between Nanjing and Wuhan. The Yichang-Lichuan-Wanzhou  and Lichuan-Chongqing sections are routed through the mountainous areas of the southwestern Hubei and the eastern section Chongqing Municipality, where no railways or reliable highways previously existed, providing a much more direct rail connection between the Sichuan Basin and Eastern China than previously existing ones (such as the one using the older Xiangyu railway).

References 

High-speed railway lines in China
Standard gauge railways in China